The Kidnapping Act 1961 is a statute of the Parliament of Singapore that criminalizes the illegal abduction, wrongful restraints and wrongful confinement of any person. The law is designed specifically to make acts of knowingly seeking and receiving ransom in connection with the kidnap of any person a criminal offence.

Overview
The Kidnapping Act is an Act to deter unlawful abduction, wrongful restraint and wrongful confinement of any person. It was originally enacted in 1961.

The Kidnapping Act defines the punishment to be meted out for different scenarios of violations, and serves as an instrument for imprisoning and caning of offenders. The abduction, wrongful restraint or wrongful confinement for ransom is primarily subjected to life imprisonment and even capital punishment. The Act also prescribes punishment for accomplices and individuals that consort with offenders and kidnappers, such as those that receive ransoms and negotiate for ransoms. The Act empowers the Public Prosecutor to freeze bank accounts and order the inspection of books, accounts, receipts, vouchers or other documents, and to obtain information as well as intercepting communication. The Act expresses that it is the duty of any person in the know to give information on kidnapping acts to the police, and such a person may also be found guilty and subjected to a fine and imprisonment if he or she fails in doing so.

Uses of the Act

In the mid-2010s, kidnap scams were more proliferate in Singapore than the actual act of kidnapping itself. The Singapore Police Force has set up the Scam Alert web service that keeps Singaporeans informed on the latest scams such as kidnapping scams.

See also
Singapore Police Force

References

External links
KIDNAPPING ACT 1961

1961 in law
1961 in Singapore
Singaporean criminal law
Singaporean legislation
Kidnapping in Singapore